Calasiao, officially the Municipality of Calasiao,  is a 1st class municipality in the province of Pangasinan, Philippines. According to the 2020 census, it has a population of 100,471 people.

Today, Calasiao is known as a first class, highly commercialized municipality and is strategically located at the heart of Pangasinan. It governs 24 barangays and 31 sitios in a total land area of 4,836 hectares. Being a town adjacent to Dagupan, the municipality experiences continuous economic boom and is increasingly becoming an important satellite commercial hub for Metro Dagupan. In terms of delicacy, Calasiao's flagship product is the native rice cake known as Puto Calasiao.

Etymology
The name Calasiao was derived from the native word Kalasian, which means "a place where lightning frequently occurs", from the root word lasi, meaning "lightning". Upon the arrival of the Spaniards, they called the place "Lugar de Rayos", a literal Spanish translation of the word Kalasian. It was named as such because it is said that Calasiao back in the day was always frequented by this natural phenomenon.

History
The indigenous people of Calasiao are descended from the Austronesian-speaking people who settled in the Malay archipelago at least 5,000 years ago. Calasiao was settled by a Pangasinan speaking people whose language belongs to the Malayo-Polynesian branch of the Austronesian languages family.

In 1571, the Spanish conquest of Pangasinan began. The Spanish conquistadors were accompanied by Roman Catholic missionaries who introduced Roman Catholicism to the indigenous peoples of Pangasinan.

In the 16th century, Dominican friars, who were settling at Gabon, were driven out because of the continuing unrest in the town. The formation of the new Calasiao however was not immediately welcomed by its native inhabitants. Hence in 1660, when the call for the Malong Rebellion came, the citizens picked up their weapons and joined in the fight against the Spanish rule. The citizens were also one of the first people to answer the call for rebellion of Juan de la Cruz Palaris of Binalatongan (now San Carlos City), which succeeded in driving the Spanish rulers and friars out of the boundaries. The town of Calasiao became part of the Pangasinan encomendia of Labaya, designated as belonging to the King of Spain, Juan Ximenez del opaline, and a son of Alonso Hernandez de Sandoval for whom tributes were collected.

Today, Calasiao is rapidly expanding town. It may soon become a city or join with Dagupan and San Carlos City to be a metropolis. Yet many people from Calasiao have emigrated to other parts of the Philippines, the United States and other countries to seek better opportunities.

Geography

Barangays
Calasiao is politically subdivided into 24 barangays. These barangays are headed by elected officials: Barangay Captain, Barangay Council, whose members are called Barangay Councilors. All are elected every three years.

† indicates the most populous barangay.
^ The seat of government

Climate

Demographics

The people speak Pangasinan, the dominant language in central Pangasinan. Ilocano, Tagalog, and English are also widely spoken.

Economy

Calasiao is centrally located in Pangasinan, between Dagupan and San Carlos City, with a major road connecting Calasiao to both cities. The town is also connected to Santa Barbara, from where the MacArthur Highway connects to Baguio City and Metro Manila.

Calasiao has rich farmlands planted mainly with palay or rice, coconuts and mangoes. Calasiao also has a lot of fishponds along its rivers and wetlands where fish like bangus (milkfish), pantat (catfish), and tilapia are raised. A Coca-Cola Bottlers plant is located in Purok 7 Barangay Bued Calasiao.

Fast-food chains Jollibee, Chowking, and Gery's Grill all have a branch in the town, while car companies Toyota, Honda, Nissan and Mitsubishi have dealerships in the town. The Regency Hotel in Calasiao has become the biggest competitor of the Star Plaza Hotel in Dagupan. Dagupeńa, a famous restaurant from Dagupan, has moved to Calasiao.

In June 2010, Robinsons Malls announced the construction of its 30th mall in this town.

Government
Calasiao, belonging to the third congressional district of the province of Pangasinan, is governed by a mayor designated as its local chief executive and by a municipal council as its legislative body in accordance with the Local Government Code. The mayor, vice mayor, and the councilors are elected directly by the people through an election which is being held every three years.

The town hall is located in front of the Roman Catholic convent of San Pedro y San Pablo de Calasiao, the same building as the shrine of Senor Divino Tesoro. The current mayor is Mamilyn A. Caramay, who took over the mayoralty post from Joseph Arman C. Bauzon, following his victory in the May 2022 elections. 
 
Like other towns in the Philippines, Calasiao is governed by a mayor and vice mayor who are elected to three-year terms. The mayor is the executive head and leads the town's departments in executing the ordinances and improving public services. The vice mayor heads a legislative council (Sangguniang Bayan) consisting of councilors from the Barangays of Barrios.

Elected officials
The town is led by Mayor Mamilyn A. Caramat, Vice Kevin Roy Q. Macanlalay, and eight other councilors.

Tourism

Calasiao is a short ride to the Bonuan Blue Beach and the Hundred Islands in Lingayen Gulf. Calasiao is about 2 hour ride to Baguio City and a four-hour ride to Manila.

Calasiao is known for its puto, a soft rice cake; suman, a sweet coconut and sticky rice cake wrapped in banana leaves; and bagoong, or fermented fish paste. Calasiao puto is described as the town's "white gold."  Calasiao puto is a bite-size, soft rice cake made from semi-glutinous rice that is fermented in earthen jars. It is produced mainly in Barangay Dinalaoan.

Many pilgrims from neighbouring cities/towns and provinces visit Calasiao to pray at the Senor Divino Tesoro shrine. The statue of a crucified Jesus Christ is believed to grow in size and grant miracles.

Puto festival

Calasiao celebrates a puto industry festival. The Calasiao puto is a rice cake that is well known all over the Philippines for its melt-in-the-mouth feeling. It is locally sold along the streets going to Sr. Divino Tesoro.

It is known for its "white gold": "cup-shaped, bite-sized, soft rice cakes; the semi-glutinous rice is fermented in old earthen jars" (in villages of Dinalaoan, Lumbang, Ambuetel, and part of Nalsian).

Calasiao puto is made of long grain rice soaked in water, ground and fermented for three days of more, with just enough sugar to taste, and steamed. It can be topped with cheese or drizzled with chocolate syrup for variation. It is perfect to be paired with dinuguan. The town has the traditional white puto and many flavors like pandan (green), ube (violet), banana (yellow), strawberry (light red/pink) and cheese (gold).

The original white puto and kutsinta (another rice cake variety) is sold at P80 per kilogram (70 to 75 pieces), while the flavored ones are sold at P80 per kg. The price is higher by P15 to P20 in other areas to cover transportation costs.

Bella's Puto consumes three to six sacks of rice a day to make puto, depending on the season. Peak production period is from October to January. A sack of rice can produce 8,000 pieces or 107 kg of puto. Bella's Puto is sold at four SM shopping mall branches, in Santa Mesa (Manila), Baliwag (Bulacan), Clark (Pampanga) and Rosales (Pangasinan). It is also sold in a store in Caloocan and at the Pasalubong Center in Rosales town.

Bocayo (sweetened coconut) and dinuguan are also the best products of Nalsian Bacayao and Nalsian Centro. Calasiao celebrates its town fiesta every May 2 and 3: the feast day of Señor Divino Tesoro. Every June 28 and 29 is the fiesta of San Pedro and San Pablo, which were the dates of the Calasiao fiesta.

Notable personalities 
 Mitoy Yonting

References

External links

 Calasiao Profile at PhilAtlas.com
 
 Municipal Profile at the National Competitiveness Council of the Philippines
 Calasiao at the Pangasinan Government Website
 Local Governance Performance Management System
 [ Philippine Standard Geographic Code]
 Philippine Census Information

Municipalities of Pangasinan